The Reverse of the Medal is a 1923 British silent war film directed by George A. Cooper and starring Clive Brook, John Stuart and Olaf Hytten.

Partial cast
 Clive Brook - General 
 John Stuart - Pilot 
 Olaf Hytten - Strategist 
 Bertram Terry

References

External links
 

1923 films
1923 war films
British war films
Films directed by George A. Cooper
British silent short films
British black-and-white films
1920s English-language films
1920s British films